Irv Gotti Presents... The Murderers is a compilation album by American record producer Irv Gotti and hip hop group the Murderers. It was released on March 21, 2000, by Murder Inc. Records and Def Jam Recordings. Recording sessions took place at Quad Studios, at Battery Studios, at The Hit Factory, at Sound On Sound, at Right Track Studios, and at Electric Lady Studios in New York, and at Enterprise Studios, and at Westlake Audio in Los Angeles. Production was primarily handled by Irv Gotti, as well as Lil' Rob, Dat Nigga Reb, Mr. Fingaz, Damizza, DL, JB Money and Ty Fyffe. Beside Ja Rule, Black Child, Tah Murdah, Vita, O-1 and Chris Black, it features contributions by the rest of Murder Inc. roster, such as Ronnie Bumps, and Murder Inc., as well as guest appearances from Dave Bing, Shade Sheist, Busta Rhymes, Lil' Mo and Memphis Bleek.

The album peaked at number 15 on the Billboard 200 and number 2 on the Top R&B/Hip-Hop Albums in the United States and at number 74 in Germany. The album sold 80,000 copies in its first week.  The album has sold 360,000 units.

Track listing

Sample credits
Track 2 contains elements from "Murderer" written by Mark Myrie & Clement Dodd and performed by Buju Banton
Track 4 contains interpolations from "Gonna Fly Now (Theme From Rocky)" written by Carol Connors, William Conti & Ayn Robbins
Track 7 contains excerpts from "Somebody's Gonna Off the Man" written by Barry White and performed by The Love Unlimited Orchestra
Track 12 contains excerpts from "Help Somebody Please" written by Robert Dukes & Eddie Levert and performed by The O'Jays
Track 13 contains excerpts from "Doctor and Sheriff in the Myer's House" written and performed by John Carpenter
Track 18 features samples from "The Feeling We Once Had" written by Charlie Smalls
Track 23 contains excerpts from "Niggas Don't Give a Fuck" written by Calvin Broadus, Delmar Arnaud & Ricardo Brown and performed by Tha Dogg Pound

Personnel
Irving "Irv Gotti" Lorenzo – mixing (tracks: 2-4, 6-7, 9, 15-16, 18-19, 21, 23-25), producer (tracks: 1-4, 6-7, 9-10, 12-13, 15-16, 18-19, 23-25), re-mixing (track 25), executive producer

The Murderers

Jeffrey "Ja Rule" Atkins – vocals (tracks: 2-4, 6-7, 10, 16, 18, 21, 25)
Ramel "Black Child" Gill – vocals (tracks: 2-4, 6, 12, 16, 18-19, 21, 23, 25)
Tiheem "Caddillac Tah" Crocker – vocals (tracks: 2-4, 6, 15-16, 18, 21, 23, 25)
LaVita "Vita" Raynor – vocals (tracks: 3, 6-9, 18, 25)
Otha "O-1" Miller – vocals (tracks: 18, 23)
Christopher "Jody Mack" Bristole – vocals (track 22)

Guest musicians

Earl "DMX" Simmons – vocals (track 13)
BJ – vocals (track 18)
Tramayne "Shade Sheist" Thompson – vocals (track 21)
Ronnie "Ronnie Bumps" Lane – vocals (track 23)
Dave "Dave Bing" Parks – vocals (tracks: 23-24)
Cynthia "Lil' Mo" Loving – vocals (track 24)
Trevor "Busta Rhymes" Smith – vocals (track 25)
Shawn "Jay-Z" Carter – vocals (track 25)
Malik "Memphis Bleek" Cox – vocals (track 25)
Taiwan "Mr. Fingaz" Green – organ (track 12), producer (tracks: 9, 25)
Steve Hunter – guitar (track 21)
Carl "Butch" Small – percussion (track 21)

Techncals

Tyrone "Ty" Fyffe – producer (track 2)
Joe Bythewood – producer (track 3)
Robert "Lil Rob" Mays – producer (tracks: 1, 4, 6, 13, 15, 16, 24), co-producer (track 10), additional programming (tracks: 12, 23)
Richard "Dat Nigga Reb" Wilson – producer (tracks: 7, 10, 12, 18, 23)
Larry "DL" Ogletree – producer (track 19)
Damian "Damizza" Young – producer (track 21)
Ken "Supa Engineer DURO" Ifill – mixing (tracks: 2, 4, 7, 10, 12, 13, 15, 16, 18, 19, 23, 25), re-mixing (track 25)
Brian Springer – mixing (tracks: 3, 6, 9)
Michael Schlesinger – mixing (track 21)
Patrick Viala – mixing (track 24), recording (tracks: 2, 3, 9, 10, 15, 16, 18, 23-25)
Carlisle Young – recording (tracks: 6, 7, 19)
Rich Keller – recording (track 13)
Vachik Aghaniantz – recording (track 21)
Brandon "B-Dawg" Rivera – midi editing (track 21)
Tom Coyne – mastering
Markus Swaby – project coordinator
Jason Noto – art direction
Scott Sandler – design
Jonathan Mannion – photography
Darcell Lawrence – A&R
Susan Sneider – management
Deidre L. Graham – marketing
Davis, Shapiro & Lewit – legal

Charts

References

External links

2000 compilation albums
East Coast hip hop compilation albums
Albums produced by Ty Fyffe
Albums produced by Irv Gotti
Gangsta rap compilation albums
Def Jam Recordings compilation albums
Albums recorded at Electric Lady Studios
Albums recorded at Westlake Recording Studios